Lepetellida is a taxonomic order of minute sea snails, marine gastropod mollusks or micromollusks in the subclass Vetigastropoda.

Superfamilies
 Fissurelloidea J. Fleming, 1822
 Haliotoidea Rafinesque, 1815
 Lepetelloidea Dall, 1882
 Lepetodriloidea J. H. McLean, 1988
 Scissurelloidea Gray, 1847

References

Vetigastropoda